Roger James Peter Kain,  (born 12 November 1944) is a British geographer and academic, who specialises in the history of maps. From 2010 to 2017 he was the Dean and Chief Executive of the School of Advanced Study of the University of London. He was elected a Fellow of the British Academy in 1990.

References 

Living people
Members of the Order of the British Empire
Fellows of the British Academy
Alumni of the University of London
Academics of the University of London
Historians of cartography
1944 births